In mathematics, the Schreier refinement theorem of group theory states that any two subnormal series of subgroups of a given group have equivalent refinements, where two series are equivalent if there is a bijection between their factor groups that sends each factor group to an isomorphic one.

The theorem is named after the Austrian mathematician Otto Schreier who proved it in 1928. It provides an elegant proof of the Jordan–Hölder theorem. It is often proved using the Zassenhaus lemma.  gives a short proof by intersecting the terms in one subnormal series with those in the other series.

Example 

Consider , where  is the symmetric group of degree 3.
 
 
The two subnormal series are not equivalent, but they have equivalent refinements:

 

 

References 

 

Theorems in group theory